Many churches have been named after the Grey Friars (Franciscans), and often they originated as Franciscan monasteries.  Notable examples are:

Greyfriars Kirk, Edinburgh
Greyfriars Church, Leicester
Greyfriars Church, Reading
Greyfriars Church, Dumfries
Greyfriars Church, Aberdeen